Peter Denton may refer to:

 Peter Denton (musician), musician with The Kooks
 Peter Denton (athlete) (1926–2000), Australian pole vaulter 
 Peter Denton (footballer) (1946–2016), British footballer